Revo (birth name Revo Jõgisalu; 9 July 1976 – 30 August 2011) was an Estonian rapper. He was one of the founding members of Estonian most influential hip-hop groups Toe Tag and A-Rühm.

Death
On 30 August 2011, aged 35, Revo Jõgisalu died from melanoma.

References

1976 births
2011 deaths
Estonian rappers
Singers from Tallinn
20th-century Estonian male singers
Deaths from melanoma
Deaths from cancer in Estonia
Place of birth missing
Place of death missing
21st-century Estonian male singers
Burials at Pärnamäe Cemetery